Peter N. Borsay was a professor of history at Aberystwyth University. He was a specialist in the social, urban and cultural history of Britain.

Selected publications
The English urban renaissance: Culture and society in the provincial town 1660-1770. Clarendon Press, Oxford, 1991. 
Provincial towns in early modern England and Ireland: Change, convergence and divergence. Oxford University Press, Oxford, 2002. (Edited with L. Proudfoot) 
A history of leisure: The British experience since 1500. Palgrave Macmillan, 2006. 
Resorts and ports: European seaside towns since 1700. Channel View Publications, 2011. (Edited with J.K. Walton) 
 Leisure cultures in urban Europe c. 1700-1870: A transnational perspective. Manchester University Press, Manchester, 2015. (Edited with J.H. Furnee) (Studies in Popular Culture series)

References

External links 

http://www.historyandpolicy.org/policy-papers/papers/binge-drinking-and-moral-panics-historical-parallels

Alumni of Lancaster University
Living people
Academics of Aberystwyth University
British historians
Year of birth missing (living people)